Sisodia Rani Garden and Palace is a palace garden  from Jaipur city in of Rajasthan state in India.
It was built by Maharaja Sawai Jai Singh II in 1728.  The place consists of tiered multi-level gardens with fountains, watercourses and painted pavilions.  A double-storeyed palace occupies the top terrace of the garden.  The palace has many galleries, pavilions and murals depicting scenes from the life of lord Krishna. The palace lies on Jaipur Agara highway.

The palace garden derives its name, Sisodia Rani Garden and Palace, from the rani (queen) for whom it was built. She hailed from the Sisodia line of Suryavanshi (Sun dynasty) Rajputs, who ruled and now nominally rule the region of Mewar in Rajasthan.

References

Further reading

 Sisodiya Garden Jaipur Complete Guide
 Jaipur
 Attraction in Jaipur

Gardens in Rajasthan
Tourist attractions in Jaipur
Palaces in Rajasthan
Houses completed in 1779
Parks in Jaipur
Palaces in Jaipur